Hungary competed at the 2015 European Games, in Baku, Azerbaijan from 12 to 28 June 2015.

Medalists

Gymnastics

Aerobic
Hungary has a total of six athletes after the performance at the 2013 Aerobic Gymnastics European Championships. One gymnast from pairs must compete in the group, making the total athletes to 6.
 Pairs – 1 pair of 2 athletes
 Groups – 1 team of 5 athletes

Artistic
Women's – 3 quota places

Rhythmic
Hungary has qualified one athlete after the performance at the 2013 Rhythmic Gymnastics European Championships.
 Individual – 1 quota place

Triathlon

Men's – Gábor Faldum, Laszlo Tarnai, Bence Bicsak
Women's – Zsanett Horváth, Dora Mester

References

Nations at the 2015 European Games
European Games
2015